This is a list of active, professional orchestra conductors from Denmark.

A

B
Giordano Bellincampi
Maria Badstue

C

D

Thomas Dausgaard

E
Claus Efland

F

G

H
Kaare Hansen
Bo Holten

I

J
Morten Schuldt Jensen

K
Christian Kluxen

L
Lassen Peter Ernst

M
Lars Ulrik Mortensen
Niels Muus

N
Jesper Nordin

O

P

Q

R
Frans Rasmussen

S
Michael Schønwandt
Thomas Søndergaard

T

U

VW
Tamás Vetö

XYZ

ÆØÅ

External links
Dansk Kapelmesterforening (The Association of Danish Conductors) website

Danish conductors (music)